Hostel Hudugaru Bekagiddare (transl. Hostel Boys Needed) is a 2023 Indian Kannada-language pop culture comedy film directed by Nithin Krishnamurthy, starring Rishab Shetty, Pawan Kumar, Divya Spandana as cameos, and Hostel Hudugaru Bekagiddare team. This film will be presented by Rakshit Shetty under the Paramvah Pictures banner.

Plot
Hostel Hudugaru Bekagiddare shot in the backdrop of Mangaluru and Bengaluru ambiance, is a pop culture comedy flick that happens in one night in a hostel, and is shot in a cinema verite style.

Cast

Divya Spandana
Rishab Shetty
Pawan Kumar
Prajwal BP									
Rakesh Rajkumar									
Srivatsa 									
Tejas Jayanna Urs									
Shreyas Sharma									
Bharath Rao									
Anil Huliya 									
Pavan Sharma									
Nithin Krishnamurthy									
Shravan									
Venu Madhav									
Gagan Godgai									
Chethan Durga									
Mukesh Singh									
Manjunath Nayaka									
Anirudh Vedanti

Soundtrack

Hostel Hudugaru Bekagiddare released its first single on A2 Music titled as "The Hostel Hudugaru Protest Song" on January 5, 2023. This song penned by Yograj Bhat, composed and sung by B. Ajaneesh Loknath is entirely set up and shot inside a hostel premises, with a special cameo by Rishab Shetty, Pawan Kumar and Shine Shetty.

Marketing

HHB'''s first look poster was launched by Dr. Puneeth Rajkumar, and released their promotional teaser on the famous Burj Khalifa through Kiccha Sudeep. Hostel Hudugaru Bekagiddare'' also roped in famous faces like Rakshit Shetty and Divya Spandana for their promotions.

References

External links